Elliott Roosevelt may refer to:

 Elliott Roosevelt (general) (1910–1990), American general
 Elliott Roosevelt (socialite) (1860–1894), American socialite